The boxing competitions at the 2018 Mediterranean Games took place between 25 and 30 June at the Torredembarra Pavilion in Torredembarra.

Athletes competed in 9 weight categories. Only men's boxing was held.

Medal table

Medalists

References

External links
2018 Mediterranean Games – Boxing

 
Sports at the 2018 Mediterranean Games
2018
Mediterranean Games